John Alexander Flett (born 15 June 1963 at Manly, NSW) is a former rugby union footballer. He earned 4 international caps playing for the Wallabies. He played as a winger.

References

Australian rugby union players
Australia international rugby union players
Living people
1963 births
Rugby union wings
Rugby union players from Sydney